Diane Adehm (born 13 September 1970 in Ettelbruck) is a Luxembourgish politician of the Christian Social People's Party (CSV). She has been a deputy since 2011.

Biography 
Adehm attended the Diekirch Classical High School. From 1989 to 1994, she studied economic and social science at the Our Lady of Peace University Faculties in Namur, Belgium where she obtained a master's degree. In 2006, she obtained a Master of Business Administration degree at the Sacred Heart University in Connecticut.

Adehm joined the Christian Social People's Party in 2003.

She was an auditor at the Court of Auditors of the Grand Duchy of Luxembourg.

In 2005, Adehm was elected to the Hesperange communal council, before she became an échevine of the commune. In 2009, she stood for the general election but was not elected. On March 8, 2011, she replaced Jean-Louis Schiltz as a deputy of the Centre constituency. She was re-elected in 2013 and 2018.

On June 18, 2014, Adehm voted in favour of the legalisation of same-sex marriage with 21 other deputies of the CSV party.

References 

21st-century Luxembourgian women politicians
21st-century Luxembourgian politicians
Christian Social People's Party politicians
Councillors in Luxembourg
Members of the Chamber of Deputies (Luxembourg) from Centre
1970 births
Living people
People from Ettelbruck